Ganges is an unincorporated community in Richland County, in the U.S. state of Ohio.

History
Ganges was originally called Trucksville, and under the latter name was platted in 1817 by William Trucks, and named for him. A post office was established under the name Truxville in 1821, the name was changed to Ganges in 1836, and the post office closed in 1906.

Notable Citizens

Garry Bly

References

Unincorporated communities in Richland County, Ohio
Unincorporated communities in Ohio